Abbas Qeshlaqi (also Romanized as ʿAbbās Qeshlāqī; also known as Moḩammadābād, Nūrī Kandī, and Nūr Kandī) is a village in Arshaq-e Gharbi Rural District, Moradlu District, Meshgin Shahr County, Ardabil Province, Iran. At the 2006 census, its population was 221, in 34 families.

References 

Towns and villages in Meshgin Shahr County